The 2013 Trophée des Alpilles was a professional tennis tournament played on hard courts. It was the fifth edition of the tournament which was part of the 2013 ATP Challenger Tour. It took place in Saint-Rémy-de-Provence, France between 2 and 8 September 2013.

Singles main-draw entrants

Seeds

 1 Rankings are as of August 26, 2013.

Other entrants
The following players received wildcards into the singles main draw:
  Martin Vaïsse
  Enzo Couacaud
  Maxime Chazal
  Konstantin Kravchuk

The following players received entry from the qualifying draw:
  Denis Matsukevich
  David Rice
  Yannick Jankovits
  Purav Raja

The following players received entry as a lucky loser the singles main draw:
  Marcelo Demoliner

Champions

Singles

 Marc Gicquel def.  Matteo Viola 6–4, 6–3

Doubles

 Pierre-Hugues Herbert /  Albano Olivetti def.  Marc Gicquel /  Josselin Ouanna 6–3, 6–7(5–7), [15–13]

External links
Official website

Trophee des Alpilles
Trophée des Alpilles
2013 in French tennis